Hana Vagnerová (born 21 February 1983) is a Czech stage and television actress.

Biography 
She was born in 1983 in Prague, Czechoslovakia. She was raised in Prague's district Jižní Město. She began as a model. She studied at a Gymnasium and at the Theatrical Academy of Musical Arts.

Filmography

Film

Vyvraždění rodiny Greenů (2002) (TV)
Seance Fiction (2003)
Probuzená skála (2003) (TV)
Pokus (2006) (TV)
O Šípkové  Růžence (2006) (TV)
Aussig (2007), as Lenka Šimková 
Báthory (2007) 
Ďáblova lest (2008) (TV), as Iveta Runová
Pohádkové počasí (2008) (TV)
Hlasy za zdí (2011)
A Vote for the King of the Romans (2016)
Bikers (2017)
Špindl 2 (2019)
Snowing! (2019)
Bet on Friendship (2021)
Borders of Love (2022)

Television
Zdivočelá země (1997), as Miss Maděrová
On je žena (2004), as Erika Maxová
Horákovi (2006), as Eva Krátká
Proč bychom se netopili (2009)
Vyprávěj (2009–2013)
Odsúdené (2009–2010)
Organised Crime Unit (2011–2016), as Tereza Hodáčová
Vraždy v kruhu (2015), as Sábina Borová
Lajna (2017), as Denisa

Theatre

ABC Theatre
České Vánoce .... Anča
Anna Karenina .... Kitty Shchebackaya
Miláček Ornifle .... Markéta
Our Town .... Emilie Webb

Other stage works 
A Streetcar Named Desire .... Stella, Disko Theatre
Bedbound .... girl with polio, A Studio Rubín
Faust .... Markétka, A Studio Rubín
Don Juan .... Elvira
Oresteia .... Elektra
Libertin .... Young Holbach

References

External links 
 
  City Theatres, Prague (Archive)

Czech stage actresses
Czech film actresses
Czech television actresses
Living people
1983 births
Actresses from Prague
21st-century Czech actresses
Academy of Performing Arts in Prague alumni